Bala is a given name and surname. People with that name include:

Nickname
 A. Balasubramaniam (born 1971), Indian sculptor, painter, printmaker, and installation artist
 Bala (director), South Indian film director

Given name
 Bala Achi (1956–2005), Niɡerian historian, writer, and academician
 Bala Ade Dauke (died 2005), Nigerian leader
 Bala Ali (1968–?), footballer
 Bala Bachchan (born 1966), Indian politician
 Bala Bhegade (born 1976), Indian politician
 Bala Bredin (1916–2005), British Army officer
 Bala Dahir (born 1995), Nigerian footballer
 Bala Deshpande, Indian venture capitalist
 Bala Devi Chandrashekar, Bharatanatyam dancer and teacher
 Bala Ganapathi William (born 1990), Malaysian actor and director known professionally as BGW
 Bala Garba (born 1974), Nigerian footballer and coach
 Bala Garba Jahumpa (born 1958), Gambian politician and diplomat
 Bala Hijam (born 1992), Indian actress
 Bala Jones (fl. 1901), Wales rugby player
 Bala Kumar, South Indian film actor
 Bala Mohammed (born 1958), Nigerian senator
 Bala Murali (born 1969), Indian cricket umpire
 Bala S. Manian (born 1944), Indian-born Silicon Valley entrepreneur
 Bala Sawant (died 2015), Indian politician from Maharashtra
 Bala Tampoe (1922–2014), Sri Lankan lawyer and a trade unionist
 Balavarman (r. 398–422), ruler of Kamarupa

Surname
 Abdullahi Bala (born 1967), Nigerian academic, author, and professor of soil science
 Ajayan Bala, Indian writer, film director, and screenplay writer
 Aliko Bala (born 1997), Nigerian Footballer
 Anju Bala (born 1979), Indian politician
 Bala Anandan, an Indian politician
 Bhai Bala (1466–1544), Saint of the Sikh Religion
 Carlos Balá (1925–2022), Argentine actor and comedian
 Chris Bala (born 1978), American Ice-Hockey Player
 Danillo Bala (born 1993), Brazilian Footballer
 Fábio Bala (born 1981), Brazilian Footballer
 Iwan Bala (born 1956), Welsh Artist
 Krystian Bala (born 1973), Polish Writer, Photographer and Convicted Murderer
 Kujtim Bala (born 1990), Kosovar Football Player, playing for Halmstads BK
 Manju Bala (born 1989), Indian Track and Field Athlete
 Parveen Bala, Fijian Politician
 Roland Bala (born 1990), Papua New Guiler*
 Jotaro Bala (born 1970), StarDust Crusaders*

See also 
 Bala (disambiguation)